Gary Boyd (born 24 January 1972) is an Australian sailor. He competed in the 49er event at the 2004 Summer Olympics.

References

External links
 

1972 births
Living people
Australian male sailors (sport)
Olympic sailors of Australia
Sailors at the 2004 Summer Olympics – 49er
Sportspeople from Newcastle, New South Wales